Tomassoni awards was the overarching name of two prizes for outstanding achievements in physics, the Premio Felice Pietro Chisesi e Caterina Tomassoni and the Premio Caterina Tomassoni e Felice Pietro Chisesi. The two prizes were awarded every one or two years from 2001 to 2011 by the Sapienza University of Rome. The prize values were €80,000 and €40,000, respectively.

In 2013 the awards were unified into a single prize, to be known as the Caterina Tomassoni and Felice Pietro Chisesi Prize. The combined prize will be presented each year on April, at the Sapienza University of Rome with a value of Euro 50,000.

Recipients

Source: Tomassoni Awards

Premio Felice Pietro Chisesi e Caterina Tomassoni
2001 Serge Haroche
2003 Pierre Encrenaz
2004 Till Kirsten
2005 Igor Dmitriyevich Novikov
2006 Wolfgang Götze
2008 Edward Lorenz
2009 Gabriele Veneziano
2010 Massimo Inguscio
2011 Paul Linford Richards

Premio Caterina Tomassoni e Felice Pietro Chisesi
2001 Ignazio Ciufolini 
2003 Lisa Randall
2004 Federico Capasso
2005 Piero Zucchelli
2006 Savas Dimopoulos
2008 Gerald Gabrielse
2009 Thomas Ebbesen
2010 Alex Zunger
2011 Herbert Spohn

Combined Caterina Tomassoni e Felice Pietro Chisesi Prize
2013 Alain Aspect
2014 Igor Klebanov
2015 Charles L. Bennett
2016 Adalberto Giazotto
2017 Fabiola Gianotti
2018 Philip Kim and Scott Aaronson
2019 Giulia Galli and Alexander Szameit
2020 Jo Dunkley and Karoline Schäffner
2021 Michele Vendruscolo and Zohar Komargodski

See also

 List of physics awards

References

Physics awards
Awards established in 2013
Italian awards